30 Hudson Yards (also the North Tower) is a supertall skyscraper in the West Side of Midtown Manhattan, New York City. Located near Hell's Kitchen, Chelsea, and the Penn Station area, the building is part of the Hudson Yards Redevelopment Project, a plan to redevelop the Metropolitan Transportation Authority's West Side Yard. It is the sixth-tallest building in New York City and the eighth-tallest in the United States as of November 2022.

The building has a triangular observation deck, known as The Edge, jutting out from the 100th floor, with a bar and event space on the 101st floor. This observation deck, at 1,100 feet, opened in March 2020 and is the second-highest outdoor observation deck containing optically transparent flooring in the world, after Skywalk in Madeira. It offers new skyline views to the south and east of Manhattan; the surrounding New York City boroughs; and westward across the Hudson River, the U.S. state of New Jersey.

History
The groundbreaking ceremony took place on December 4, 2012. Early construction work focused on building a platform to cover much of the Eastern Rail Yard, for much of Phase 1 to sit upon and to allow the Gateway Rail Tunnel project to pass underground with a clear path. The platform is rested on caissons that are drilled underground into the  solid bedrock known as Manhattan schist. On December 12, 2013, it was announced that Tutor Perini Building Corp. was awarded a US$510 million contract to build the platform.

In 2013, Time Warner (later WarnerMedia, and now Warner Bros. Discovery) announced its intention to move most of its offices to 30 Hudson Yards, vacating its current headquarters at the Time Warner Center, also owned by Related, at Columbus Circle. The company would occupy half the building, below the 38th floor.

In mid-2015, Related received a $690 million loan from Bank of America, Wells Fargo, and CIBC which allowed construction to start. By January 2016, the structure's first few aboveground floors were already complete. Construction of the observation deck at the top of the tower began in April 2018. The observation deck was nearly complete by mid-2018.

In January 2019, WarnerMedia hired Douglas Harmon and Adam Spies of Cushman & Wakefield to find a buyer that would sell their office condominium and allow the company to lease it back—known as a sale-leaseback. WarnerMedia's office condo included more than 1.4 million square feet on floors 16 through 51 and represented approximately 60 percent of the 90-story tower with 2.6 million square feet.

The building opened on March 15, 2019. The sale closed in June 2019. The partners financed the purchase with a 10-year, $1.43 billion commercial mortgage-backed security interest-only loan from Deutsche Bank, Wells Fargo, and Goldman Sachs. In June, KKR took out a $490 million mortgage from Deutsche Bank on their office condominium space.

Tenants
 Lobby: Warner Bros. Discovery, Wells Fargo, The Shops & Restaurants at Hudson Yards (retail), Jack's Stir Brew Coffee
 Floors 1–15: Wells Fargo Securities
 Floors 16–51: Warner Bros. Discovery
 Floor 25: (mechanical floor)
 Floor 35: (sky lobby)
 Floor 52: (mechanical floor)
 Floors 60–65: Wells Fargo Securities 
 Floors 66–71: Facebook
 Floors 72–73: The Related Companies 
 Floors 74–83: Kohlberg Kravis Roberts
 Floor 79: (mechanical floor)
 Floors 80-99 do not exist.
 Floors 100–101: (observation deck)
 Floor 101: (event space)
 Floors 102–103 (mechanical floors)

Studios
17N: CNN Newsroom, Early Start, Reliable Sources
19X: multi purposed studio
19Y: At This Hour, CNN Tonight, New Day, Quest Means Business
19Z: Don Lemon Tonight, Erin Burnett OutFront, Fareed Zakaria GPS
21L: Anderson Cooper 360°

Architecture and design
Kohn Pedersen Fox was chosen for the design of the building, while Thornton Tomasetti was lead structural engineer and Jaros, Baum & Bolles provided MEP engineering services. WarnerMedia's space features amenities including a cafeteria, a fitness center, a two-level auditorium and cinema and an outdoor deck.

The building's lobby will contain artwork by Spanish artist Jaume Plensa consisting of 11 stainless steel spheres hanging from the ceiling, meant to represent global unity and cultural diversity.

Edge 

The building features an  outdoor observation deck known as "Edge", located on the 100th and 101st floors. Edge contains a cantilevered outdoor terrace jutting  outward south of the building on the 100th floor, providing panoramic views of Manhattan and the Hudson River. It is the second tallest outdoor observation deck in the Western Hemisphere, after Skywalk in Madeira, and the second highest observation deck in New York City, after One World Observatory. There is also a grand outdoor staircase on the east side of the deck.

Edge opened to visitors on March 11, 2020, and temporarily closed two days later due to the COVID-19 pandemic in New York City. Edge reopened on September 2, 2020.

City Climb at Edge 

In October, it was announced that 30 Hudson Yards would host another attraction dubbed “City Climb at Edge” which allows visitors to ascend an outdoor staircase located at the top of the tower's crown. It was opened to the public on November 9, 2021, and is the highest open-air building ascent in the world.

Gallery

See also 
 List of tallest buildings in New York City
 Hudson Yards Redevelopment Project
 List of tallest freestanding structures in the world
 List of tallest freestanding steel structures
 List of tallest buildings

References

External links 

 
 New York City project website
 Related Companies project website
 Animation: building the platform while trains run through Brookfield properties, via Gothamist.com
 Hudson Yards news and developments
 YouTube videos containing a photographic compilation of its construction

Chelsea, Manhattan
Hudson Yards, Manhattan
2019 establishments in New York City
2010s in Manhattan
Kohn Pedersen Fox buildings
Oxford Properties
Skyscraper office buildings in Manhattan
Office buildings completed in 2019
Buildings developed by the Related Companies
Mass media company headquarters in the United States
Warner Bros. Discovery
Wells Fargo buildings